Modern poetry may refer to:
The most recent periods in the history of poetry
Modernist poetry, the application of modernist aesthetics to poetry

See also
"Of Modern Poetry", a poem by Wallace Stevens published in 1942